Yukari Mizuno (水野友加里 Mizuno Yukari; born October 5, 1986 in Tokyo, Japan)  is a Japanese actress who appeared in movies such as Ice Memory, Director! and The sign man falling in love.

Filmography
 「アイスメモリ」(Ice Memory)「カントク」(Director! )「恋するサインマン」(The sign man falling in love)  (2005)

External links
TOYOTA OFFICE INC, (in Japanese)
CREATURA (in Japanese)
JMDb Profile (in Japanese)

Japanese actresses
1986 births
Living people